Vlădiceasca may refer to several villages in Romania:

 Vlădiceasca, a village in Valea Argovei Commune, Călărași County
 Vlădiceasca, a village in Snagov Commune, Ilfov County